Hollywood Cemetery may refer to:

in the United States
(by state)
Hollywood Cemetery, Confederate Section, Hot Springs, Arkansas, listed on the National Register of Historic Places in Arkansas
 Hollywood Forever Cemetery, listed on the National Register of Historic Places in California
Hollywood Cemetery (Jackson, Tennessee), listed on the National Register of Historic Places in Tennessee
Hollywood Cemetery (Richmond, Virginia), listed on the National Register of Historic Places in Virginia